Rania Al-Abdullah (born Rania Al-Yassin, 31 August 1970) is Queen of Jordan as the wife of King Abdullah II.

Rania was born in Kuwait to Palestinian parents. She received her bachelor's degree in business at The American University in Cairo. In 1991, following the Gulf War, she and her family fled to Amman, Jordan, where she met Prince Abdullah of Jordan. Before meeting him, she worked at Citibank and then took a job in the marketing department at Apple Inc. Since marrying Abdullah in 1993, she has become known for her advocacy work related to education, health, community empowerment, youth, cross-cultural dialogue and micro-finance. 

Forbes magazine has ranked Rania as one of the world's 100 most powerful women.

Personal life

Early life
 
Rania Al-Yassin was born on 31 August 1970 in Kuwait, to Palestinian parents. Her father,  (1934–2022) was from Tulkarm in the West Bank. She also has Turkish roots on her maternal grandfather's side. Rania received a degree in business administration from the American University in Cairo. Upon her graduation, she worked briefly in marketing for Citibank, followed by a job with Apple Inc. in Amman, Jordan.

Marriage and family
Rania met Jordanian Prince Abdullah bin Al-Hussein at a dinner party in January 1993. On 10 June 1993, they were married. Their wedding ceremony was considered a national holiday. The couple has four children:

Crown Prince Hussein (born 28 June 1994 at King Hussein Medical Center in Amman)
Princess Iman (born 27 September 1996 at King Hussein Medical Center in Amman)
Princess Salma (born 26 September 2000 at King Hussein Medical Center in Amman)
Prince Hashem (born 30 January 2005 at King Hussein Medical Center in Amman)

Abdullah ascended the throne on 7 February 1999, and proclaimed Rania queen on 22 March 1999.

Areas of work
Since her marriage, Queen Rania has used her position to advocate for various sectors of society in Jordan and beyond.

Domestic agenda

Education

Queen Rania has launched and championed several initiatives in education and learning. Queen Rania has stated that an essential aspect of education is to equip young people with the necessary skills to perform well in the workplace.

In July 2005, in partnership with the Ministry of Education, the King and Queen launched an annual teachers' award, the Queen Rania Award for Excellence in Education.

The Queen is Chairperson of Jordan's first interactive children's museum, which opened in May 2007. In April 2008, the Queen launched "Madrasati" ("My School"), a public-private initiative aimed at refurbishing 500 of Jordan's public schools over a five-year period. Queen Rania also established The Queen Rania Al Abdullah Center for Educational Technology on 6 June 2001, aiming to use modern technology to serve and develop education in Jordan.

The Queen Rania Teacher Academy, which was launched in June 2009, provides professional development programs for current and new teachers in partnership with the Ministry of Education. The Queen Rania Scholarship Program partners with several universities from around the world to support scholarships and training for Jordanian students and workers in management, marketing, design, business administration, psychology, engineering, law, and other fields.

Community and youth empowerment

Queen Rania's first venture was the establishment of the Jordan River Foundation (JRF) in 1995.

The Jordan River Children Program (JRCP) was developed by Queen Rania to place children's welfare above political agendas and cultural taboos. This led to the launch, in 1998, of JRF's Child Safety Program, which addresses the immediate needs of children at risk from abuse and initiated a long-term campaign to increase public awareness about violence against children. The deaths of two children in Amman as a result of child abuse in early 2009 led Queen Rania to call for an emergency meeting of government and non-government (including JRF) stakeholders to discuss where the system was failing.

In 2009, to celebrate the 10th anniversary of her husband's accession to the throne, Queen Rania launched a community champion award (Ahel Al Himmeh) to highlight the accomplishments of groups and individuals who have helped their local communities. Queen Rania initiated the Al-Aman Fund for the Future of Orphans in 2003.

In her capacity as Regional Ambassador of INJAZ Al-Arab, Queen Rania has taught classes and engaged in dialogue with young people in other countries; she also launched INJAZ Al-Arab's presence elsewhere in the Arab world. She chaired a discussion with entrepreneurs in celebration of INJAZ Al-Arab's 10th anniversary, showcasing alumni's success stories  At the 2008 World Economic Forum in Davos, she launched the "Empowering One Million Arab Youth by 2018" campaign, which was conceived by INJAZ Arabia.

Health 
In 2005, Queen Rania established the Royal Health Awareness Society (RHAS) to educate parents and children about the basics of nutrition and hygiene, the benefits of exercise, the harms of smoking, and other areas related to health.

In 2011, the first specialized medical building for children was built in Jordan, Queen Rania Children's Hospital, established to improve the medical service for Jordanian children. The hospital provides for the care of children, especially complex medical cases including organ transplants and endoscopic operations.

Global agenda

Global education

In November 2000, in recognition of her commitment to the cause of children and youth, the United Nations Children's Fund (UNICEF) invited Queen Rania to join its Global Leadership Initiative. In early 2002 Queen Rania joined the Board of Directors of the International Youth Foundation, based in Baltimore, Maryland, in the United States. In January 2007, Queen Rania was named UNICEF's first Eminent Advocate for Children. In August 2009, Queen Rania became Honorary Global Chair of the United Nations Girls' Education Initiative (UNGEI).

As a longtime supporter of the Global Campaign for Education (GCE), Queen Rania met with children and inspirational women in South Africa, both in the cities of Johannesburg and Soweto, in March 2009. One of the stories in the book, "Maha of the Mountains", was contributed by Queen Rania.

During her April 2009 US trip, Queen Rania joined leading education advocates Congresswoman Nita Lowey and Counsellor to the Secretary of the Treasury Gene Sperling to launch "The Big Read" as part of Global Campaign for Education's global action week calling for quality basic education for all children. She was also hosted by first lady of the United States, Michelle Obama, during that same trip.

On 20 August 2009, Queen Rania co-founded and led the launch of the "1GOAL: Education for All" campaign alongside Gary Lineker, and with the help of top international footballers at Wembley Stadium, London. On 6 October 2009, Queen Rania was joined by Prime Minister Gordon Brown of the UK, the president of FIFA, Sepp Blatter, President Jacob Zuma of South Africa, and other heads of state, for the Global Launch of 1GOAL, which took place across six locations worldwide.

Cross-cultural dialogue

Queen Rania has also been particularly vocal about the importance of cross-cultural and interfaith dialogue to foster greater understanding, tolerance and acceptance across the world. She has used her status to correct what she sees as misconceptions in the West about the Arab world.

Queen Rania has played a significant role in reaching out to the global community to foster values of tolerance and acceptance, and increase cross-cultural dialogue. For example, regionally and internationally, Queen Rania has campaigned for a greater understanding between cultures in such high-profile forums as the Jeddah Economic Forum, Harvard Kennedy School at Harvard University, and the Skoll Foundation in the UK. She has also made public appearances, including a half-hour television interview on The Oprah Winfrey Show on 17 May 2006, where she spoke about misconceptions about Islam and especially women in Islam. She received the North-South Prize from the Council of Europe in March 2009  and the PeaceMaker Award from the non-profit Seeds of Peace.

In September 2006, Queen Rania also joined the United Nations Foundation board of directors. The UN Foundation builds and implements public-private partnerships to address the world's most pressing problems, and broadens support for the UN through advocacy and public outreach.

Microfinance
In September 2003, Queen Rania accepted an invitation to join the board of directors of the Foundation for International Community Assistance (FINCA).

An emissary for the United Nations' International Year of Microcredit in 2005, Queen Rania's belief in microfinance and her partnership with FINCA has generated more Jordanian micro-businesses, with the official opening of FINCA Jordan in February 2008.

Environment
In October 2020, Queen Rania was named as a member of the Earthshot Prize Council, an initiative of Prince William to find solutions to environmental issues.

Online

YouTube
Queen Rania has used YouTube as a way to promote intercultural dialogue by calling on young people around the world to engage in a global dialogue to dismantle stereotypes of Muslims and the Arab world. On 30 March 2008, Queen Rania launched her own YouTube channel, initially to invite viewers to give their opinions of the Middle East and talk about stereotypes they may have of Arabs and Muslims. Between 30 March and 12 August (International Youth Day), Queen Rania posted videos on YouTube in which she asked people to send her their questions about Islam and the Arab world. She provided responses to those questions and explained her view of the truth about various Arab and Muslim stereotypes. Over five months she posted videos on subjects that included honour killings, terrorism and the rights of Arab women. International personalities such as Dean Obeidallah, Maz Jobrani, and YouTube star Mia Rose also contributed videos to the campaign.

In 2008, Queen Rania participated in YouTube's In My Name campaign. She appeared alongside The Black Eyed Peas member will.i.am in the video, "End Poverty – Be the Generation," which urged world leaders to keep the promises they made in 2000 at the United Nations Millennium Summit.

She received the first ever YouTube Visionary Award in November 2008.

Twitter

To coincide with the visit of Pope Benedict XVI to Jordan on Friday, 8 May 2009, Queen Rania started using the micro-blogging website Twitter with the username @QueenRania. On the occasion of the World Economic Forum held at the Dead Sea in Jordan, June 2009, she conducted her first Twitter interview, answering five questions from the general public via her Twitter account.

When she joined Twitter, she also gave an interview with TechCrunch on "how Twitter can help change the world", where she said, "It's about using social media for social change: creating a community of advocates who can use their voices on behalf of the voiceless, or leverage their talents, skills, knowledge, and resources to put more children into classrooms, or pressure their elected representatives to get global education top of the agenda".

Publications
 As a tribute to King Hussein, and on the first anniversary of his death, Queen Rania produced The King's Gift, a children's book about him. Proceeds of the book go to the benefit of underprivileged children across Jordan. (Michael O'Mara Books, 2000)
 Her second book, entitled Eternal Beauty, which she wrote in celebration of Mother's Day 2008 tells the story of a young girl's conversation with a little sheep as she searches for the most beautiful thing in the world. The book was released as part of the Greater Amman Municipality's contest, called "Mama's Story".
 For the 2009 Big Read event, Queen Rania wrote "Maha of the Mountains", a short story which tells of a young girl's determination to get an education and the challenges she faced.
 The Sandwich Swap is a book inspired by an incident in her childhood. It tells the story of Lily and Salma, two best friends, who argue over the 'yucky' taste of their respective peanut butter and jelly and hummus sandwiches. The girls then overcome and embrace their differences. The book was co-authored by Queen Rania and Kelly DiPucchio.(Hyperion Books, 20 April 2010) In May 2010 the book went to the top of the New York Times Bestseller List for children's books.

Affiliations
Queen Rania campaigned for Petra to be voted as one of the New 7 Wonders of the World, including personally welcoming New7Wonders to Petra during its official world tour.

International roles and positions
In November 2000, the United Nations Children's Fund (UNICEF) invited Queen Rania to join its Global Leadership Initiative.
At the World Economic Forum in Davos in January 2007, Rania was named UNICEF's first Eminent Advocate for Children.
In August 2009, Queen Rania was named co-founder and global co-chair of 1GOAL.
July 2009, the United Nations made Queen Rania Honorary Chairperson for the United Nations Girls' Education Initiative (UNGEI).
For their Global Action Week in April 2009, the Global Campaign for Education named Queen Rania their Honorary Chairperson.
In early 2002, Queen Rania joined the board of directors of the International Youth Foundation, based in Baltimore, Maryland, in the United States.
In September 2002, Queen Rania became a member of the World Economic Forum (WEF) Foundation Board. She is also on the Foundation Board of the Forum of Young Global Leaders (YGL) and has been the chairperson for the Nominations and Selection Committee since July 2004, when the forum was established.
In September 2006, Queen Rania joined the United Nations Foundation board of directors.
Rania was a member of the Every Child Council for the GAVI Alliance.
Rania was an Honorary Member of the International Advisory Council for the International Center for Research on Women (ICRW).
Queen Rania is co-chair of the Arab Open University.
She was Honorary Chairperson of the Jordanian Chapter of Operation Smile.

Honours

Foreign
 Belgium: Grand Cordon of the Order of Leopold (18 May 2016)
 Brunei: Member First Class of the Most Esteemed Family Order of Laila Utama (13 May 2008)
 Italy: Knight Grand Cross of the Order of Merit of the Italian Republic (19 October 2009)
 Portugal:
 Grand Cross of the Order of Saint James of the Sword  (16 March 2009)
 Grand Cross of the Order of Infante Henry  (5 March 2008)
 Spain:
 Dame Grand Cross of the Order of Charles III (21 April 2006)
 Dame Grand Cross of the Royal Order of Isabella the Catholic (18 October 1999)

Awards
2001: Life Achievement Award of International Osteoporosis Foundation, Italy
2002: Ambrogino D'Oro Award from the Municipality of Milan, Italy
2002: Gold Medal of the President of the Italian Republic from Pio Manzù International Research Center, Italy
2005: Golden Plate Award, Academy of Achievement, USA
2005: Sesame Workshop Award from Sesame Workshop, USA
2007: Mediterranean Prize for Social Solidarity from the Mediterranean Foundation in Italy
2007: Global Humanitarian Action Award from UNSA-USA and the Business Council of the UN, USA
2007: Bambi Award for Attention Based Charity by Hubert Burda Media, Germany
2007: John Wallach Humanitarian Award from Seeds of Peace, USA
2008: World Savers Award from Conde Nast Traveler, USA
2008: David Rockefeller Bridging Leadership Award from Synergos University, USA
2009: The Marisa Bellisario International Award from the Fondazione Bellisario, Italy
2009: North South Prize by the North South Prize, Portugal
2009: FIFA Presidential Award, Switzerland
2010: Arab Knight of Giving Award from Arab Giving Forum, UAE
2010: The Leadership Award from White Ribbon Alliance for Safe Motherhood, USA
2010: James C. Morgan Global Humanitarian Award from Tech Awards, USA
2010: Glamour's 2010 Woman of the Year, USA
2013: Atlantic Council's Global Citizen Award, USA
2015: Walther Rathenau Award from Walther Rathenau Institut, Germany
2015: World Childhood Award from Queen Silvia's World Childhood Foundation, USA
2016: Andrea Bocelli Humanitarian Award, Italy
2016: Foreign Press Association's Humanitarian Award, UK
2016: The Golden Heart Award, Germany
2016: Medal of Honor for Women from Sheikh Mohammad Bin Rashid, presented by his Son Sheikh Hamdan at the Global Women Forum in Dubai
2017: Global Trailblazer Award, USA
2017: The Fellowship Award from Fashion for Relief in Recognition of Her Majesty's Humanitarian Efforts Towards Children Caught in Conflict, France
2018: The Influential Personality of the Year Award, at the third annual Arab Social Media Influencers Summit (ASMIS) in Dubai
2020: The PWI Most Beautiful Woman In The World Award 2020
2022: Zayed Award for Human Fraternity 2022
2022: Path to Peace Award 2022

Honorary doctorates 

 2001 Honorary Doctorate in Law (LLD) from the University of Exeter, UK
 2008 Honorary Doctorate Degree in Educational Sciences from the University of Jordan
 2008 Honorary Doctorate in International Relations from the University of Malaya, Malaysia
 2015 Honorary Doctorate in "Science Development and International Cooperation" from the University of Sapienza, Italy

References

External links

1970 births
Living people
The American University in Cairo alumni
Apple Inc. employees
Arab Open University people
Arab queens
Citigroup employees
Jordanian Internet celebrities
Jordanian royal consorts
Jordanian feminists
Jordanian Muslims
Jordanian people of Palestinian descent
UNICEF Goodwill Ambassadors
Jordanian YouTubers

Knights Grand Cross of the Order of Merit of the Italian Republic
Dames Grand Cross of the Order of Isabella the Catholic
Grand Cordons of the Order of the Precious Crown
Proponents of Islamic feminism
Grand Crosses Special Class of the Order of Merit of the Federal Republic of Germany
United Nations Foundation
People from Tulkarm
Princesses by marriage
United Arab Emirates Health Foundation Prize laureates